The Artist was an illustrated Russian magazine on theatre, music, literature and fine arts published in Moscow in 1889-1895. It was coming out monthly but only during the theatre seasons, from September till April. The playwright, translator and theatre critic Fyodor Kumanin was the journal's founder, publisher and originally its editor (N.N. Novikov held the post in 1894-1895). Another important figure instrumental with the launching of this biggest theatrical publication in Russia was Sergey Yuriev.

In 1891 the magazine started to publish two supplements, Dnevnik Artista (Artist's Diary) and Teatralnaya Biblioteka (Theatre Library, continued up until 1898).

Among the authors who contributed to the magazine regularly were professors Nikolai Storozhenko, Alexey Veselovsky, Nikolai Tikhonravov, dramatists and journalists Anton Chekhov, Vladimir Korolenko, Nestor Kotlyarevsky, Alexander Yuzhin, Alexey Pleshcheyev, Pyotr Boborykin, Kazimir Barantsevich, Vladimir Nemirovich-Danchenko, Nikolai Leskov, Viktor Goltsev, Ippolit Shpazhinsky, Andrey Sirotinin, composers Pyotr Chaykovsky, César Cui, Eduard Napravnik, Nikolai Rimsky-Korsakov, artists Abram Arkhipov, Sergei Vinogradov, Nikolai Klodt, Mikhail Nesterov, Vasily Polenov, Ilya Repin, Konstantin Trutovsky, actors Prov Sadovsky and Alexander Lensky.
 
The magazine strongly supported The Mighty Handful as well as The Society of Art and Literature formed by Konstantin Stanislavski, Fyodor Komissarzhevsky, Aleksandr Fedotov and Fyodor Sollogub in 1888.

References

1889 establishments in the Russian Empire
Defunct literary magazines published in Europe
Defunct magazines published in Russia
Magazines established in 1889
Magazines disestablished in 1895
Magazines published in Moscow